Connors Lake is a lake in Sawyer County, Wisconsin, United States. It is located in the Flambeau River State Forest. Fish species enzootic to Connors Lake include bluegill, largemouth bass, muskellunge, smallmouth bass, and walleye.

References

External links
Connors Lake at Lake-Link.com

Lakes of Sawyer County, Wisconsin